Peter A. Micciche (born December 17, 1961, in Valley Stream, New York) is an American politician and a Republican member of the Alaska Senate since January 15, 2013, representing District O. Micciche was previously the mayor of Soldotna, Alaska, and a member of its city council.

Education
Micciche earned an associate degree from Kenai Peninsula College at the University of Alaska, Anchorage and his BA in business management from Alaska Pacific University.

Elections
Micciche challenged the long-time incumbent Senator Tom Wagoner (redistricted from District Q) for the District O August 28, 2012, Republican primary and won with 3,963 votes (58.62%). Micciche was unopposed for the November 6, 2012, general election and won with 12,947 votes (94.61%) against write-in candidates.

Tenure
Micciche served as the Majority Leader from 2017 to 2018. Micciche has served as the President of the Alaska State Senate since 2021.

He has served as the chair on the Alaska Senate's Committee of Committees since 2021. He previously chaired the Senate's Resources Committee (2019-2021), Public Safety & Military and Veterans' Affairs committees (2017-2019), Health & Social Services Committee (2015-2019), Transportation Committee (2015-2017), and the Community & Regional Affairs Committee (2013-2015)

His current senate district, District O, is based in the northern regions of the Kenai Peninsula, south of the Anchorage City-borough. Its largest city is Kenai. However, following 2020 redistricting, as of January 17, 2023, the new district based around the same territory will be labelled District D.

References

External links
 Official page at the Alaska Legislature
 Official Alaska Senate Majority page 
 
 Peter Micciche at 100 Years of Alaska's Legislature

|-

1961 births
21st-century American politicians
Alaska Pacific University alumni
Republican Party Alaska state senators
Living people
Mayors of places in Alaska
People from Soldotna, Alaska
People from Valley Stream, New York
Presidents of the Alaska Senate
University of Alaska alumni